German submarine U-862 was a Type IXD2 U-boat of Nazi Germany's Kriegsmarine during World War II. After Germany's surrender in May 1945, U-862 put into Singapore and was taken over by the Imperial Japanese Navy under the name I-502.

U-862 was laid down on 15 August 1942 by DeSchiMAG AG Weser of Bremen. She was commissioned on 7 October 1943 with Kapitänleutnant Heinrich Timm in command. Timm commanded U-862 for her entire career in Kriegsmarine, receiving a promotion to Korvettenkapitän on 1 July 1944. U-862 conducted two patrols, sinking seven ships totalling .

Design
German Type IXD2 submarines were considerably larger than the original Type IXs. U-862 had a displacement of  when at the surface and  while submerged. She had two shafts and two  propellers.

U-862 was fitted with six  torpedo tubes (four fitted at the bow and two at the stern), 24 torpedoes, one  SK C/32 naval gun, 150 rounds, and a  Flak M42 with 2575 rounds as well as two  C/30 anti-aircraft guns with 8100 rounds. The boat had a complement of fifty-five.

Service history

First patrol
U-862 was one of the most travelled of all U-boats. She sailed from Germany in May 1944 and eventually reached Penang, in Japanese-controlled Malaya, in September 1944. Penang was the base for the 33rd U-boat Flotilla, code-named Monsun Gruppe ("Monsoon Group").

On the way there, she launched a T5/G7es Zaunkönig I acoustic homing torpedo at a tanker. The Zaunkönig came around full circle to home in on U-862. Only an emergency crash dive and staying silent saved the U-boat from her own torpedo. She also shot down an Allied Consolidated PBY Catalina aircraft H of No. 265 Squadron RAF on 20 August 1944 and then escaped an intense search for her. She sank several merchant ships in the Mozambique Channel between Africa and Madagascar.

Second patrol

U-862 departed for her second war patrol from Batavia in the Japanese-occupied Netherlands East Indies in December 1944. She sailed down the west coast of Australia, across the Great Australian Bight, around the southern coast of Tasmania and then north towards Sydney where she sank the U.S.-registered Liberty ship  on 25 December 1944. She then travelled around New Zealand and entered the port of Napier at night undetected. This has given birth to an urban legend in New Zealand, where it is said that the captain of U-862 sent sailors ashore at night to steal fresh milk from a farm. This may arise from a joke made by Captain Timm to Air Vice Marshal Sir Rochford Hughes in the late 1950s. U862'''s voyage to New Zealand was portrayed in a stage comedy U Boat Down Under which was written and directed by Peter Tait and performed at Downstage Theatre, Wellington from 27 July to 5 August 2006.U-862 then returned to the Indian Ocean. On 6 February 1945, about 1,520 km (820 nm) south-west of Fremantle, U-862 sank the U.S.-registered Liberty ship, which was loaded with mules bound for Burma.U-862 was also a trial boat for the FuMo 65 Hohentwiel radar system. This was cranked out of a casing on the port side of the conning tower and rose on a mast. The aerial was hand trained onto targets whilst the U-boat was on the surface.

Transfer to Japan
When Germany surrendered in May 1945, she put into Singapore and was taken over by the Imperial Japanese Navy. On 15 July 1945 she became the IJN submarine I-502.

The German crew of U-862'' suffered no casualties, and some returned to Germany several years after the war. Others who were interned at Kinmel Camp, Bodelwyddan, North Wales, remained in Wales and settled in the neighbouring communities of Rhyl, Rhuddlan and Prestatyn, due to the risks of returning to the Soviet occupied areas of Germany after the war. Two of the crew are buried at the new cemetery at Rhuddlan, North Wales, on nearby plots.

Summary of raiding history

See also
 Axis naval activity in Australian waters
 Axis naval activity in New Zealand waters

References

Bibliography

External links
 

German Type IX submarines
World War II submarines of Germany
Indian Ocean U-Boats
Military attacks against Australia
1943 ships
U-boats commissioned in 1943
Ships built in Bremen (state)
Captured U-boats
World War II submarines of Japan
Foreign submarines of the Imperial Japanese Navy
U-boats scuttled in 1946
Maritime incidents in 1946
Shipwrecks in the Strait of Malacca